Francis Lawson Taylor Buckland (May 23, 1902 in Gravenhurst, Ontario – June 23, 1991) was a Canadian sports administrator.

Buckland helped lead the Ontario Hockey Association in the 1950s and 1960s. He was president and treasurer of the amateur organization for 21 years. He was inducted into the Hockey Hall of Fame in 1975.

External links
 

1902 births
1991 deaths
Hockey Hall of Fame inductees
Ontario Hockey Association executives
People from Gravenhurst, Ontario
University of Toronto alumni

References